Watermelon steaks are cooked slices of watermelon.

Preparation
Slices of watermelon are prepared by either grilling, pan frying, baking, or roasting. Depending on the method, cooking can take a few minutes to over two hours.

If the watermelon is baked, a texture like raw fish can result, Boston Phoenix writer Robert Nadeau compares a grilled watermelon to seared, raw tuna. He added that the flavor of the fruit "isn't sweet, although it isn't meaty either, but enough of the browning comes through to make it a little like a piece of meat." When well cooked, most of the fruit's water evaporates, concentrating flavor and texture while leaving the watermelon tender; cookery writers Andrew Schloss and David Joachim consider it "kind of like a fillet steak."

See also

 List of melon dishes

References

External links
 Recipe from The Boston Globe
 Recipe from whataboutwatermelon.com

Barbecue
Meat substitutes
Watermelons
Vegan cuisine
Melon dishes
Steak